is a district divided between Sorachi and Kamikawa Subprefectures, Hokkaido, Japan.  As of 2004, the district has an estimated population of 53,011 and an area of 1,497.21 km2, giving a population density of 35.41 persons per square kilometer.

Towns and Villages

Sorachi Subprefecture
Kamisunagawa
Naie
Nanporo

Kamikawa Subprefecture
Kamifurano
Minamifurano
Nakafurano

History
1869 - With the establishment of provinces and districts in Hokkaido, Sorachi District is created within Ishikari Province.
1897 - Subprefectures created, Sorachi District is placed under Sorachi Subprefecture
1899 - Furano Village (now Furano City), and the towns of Nakafurano, Minamifurano, and Kamifurano were transferred to Kamikawa Subprefecture
On March 27, 2006 the town of Kurisawa, and the village of Kita, both in Sorachi Subprefecture, have merged into the city of Iwamizawa.

Districts in Hokkaido